Richard Waite may refer to:

Richard A. Waite (1848–1911), British-born American architect
Richard Waite (cricketer) (born 1980), English cricketer